Saint-Lin–Laurentides is a small city located in the Montcalm Regional County Municipality of Quebec, Canada. Its official name uses an en dash; however, the city's own website uses the two-hyphen version of its name: Saint-Lin-Laurentides.  In the Canada 2021 Census its population was 24,030.

Saint-Lin was the birthplace of former Canadian Prime Minister Wilfrid Laurier, whose paternal home is now a National Historic Site of Canada.

History

Saint-Lin–Laurentides was formed on 1 March 2000, when the Municipality of Saint-Lin and the Town of Laurentides were merged.

Saint-Lin was first settled in 1807 when pioneers from Saint-Pierre-du-Portage (now L'Assomption) arrived. In 1828, the Saint-Lin-de-Lachenaie Parish was founded. In 1845, the Parish Municipality of Saint-Lin was established, but was abolished 2 years later in 1847 when it was absorbed into the county municipality. That same year, its post office opened. In 1855, the municipality was reestablished as Saint-Lin-de-Lachenaye, with Carolus Laurier, father of Sir Wilfrid Laurier, as first mayor.

Laurentides was originally the Village Municipality of Saint-Lin, which became an incorporate entity in 1856. In 1883, it changed name and statutes and became the Town of Laurentides. Also that year, the local post office opened.

Demographics 

Population:
 Population in 2021: 24,030 (2006 to 2011 population change: 15.6%)
 Population in 2016: 20,786 (2006 to 2011 population change: 19.0%)
 Population in 2011: 17,463 (2006 to 2011 population change: 23.3%)
 Population in 2006: 14,159 (2001 to 2006 population change: 14.4%)
 Population in 2001: 12,379
 Population in 1996:
 Laurentides: 2703
 Saint-Lin: 9336
 Population in 1991:
 Laurentides: 2336
 Saint-Lin: 7029

Mother tongue:
 English as first language: 1.5%
 French as first language: 94.2%
 English and French as first language: 1.1%
 Other as first language: 2.5%

Education
The Commission scolaire des Samares operates francophone public schools
 École de l'Aubier
 École des Trois-Temps
 pavillon de l'Arc-en-Ciel
 pavillon de l'Oiseau-Bleu
 pavillon Sir-Wilfrid-Laurier
 École du ruisseau

Sir Wilfrid Laurier School Board operates English-language public schools. Schools serving the town:
 Joliette Elementary School in Saint-Charles-Borromée serves most of the town
 Laurentia Elementary School in Saint-Jérôme serves a portion of the town
 Joliette High School in Joliette serves all of the town

References

External links
 
  Ville de Saint-Lin-Laurentides

Cities and towns in Quebec
Incorporated places in Lanaudière